The Sony Alpha a580 (DSLR-A580) is a midrange-level digital single-lens reflex camera (DSLR) marketed by Sony and aimed at enthusiasts, it was released in August 2010. The camera features a 16.2 megapixel APS-C Type CMOS Exmor Sensor and features Sony's patented  SteadyShot INSIDE stabilisation system which works with any attached lens.

CMOS Sensor 
This sensor is capable of recording in 5 different File qualities / formats :
 Raw (.ARW)
 Raw + JPEG Fine
 Raw + JPEG Standard
 JPEG Fine 
 JPEG Standard

Sony A580 anti-dust technology 
To help combat dust particles on the sensor from changing lenses, Sony included both an anti-static coating on the sensor filter and anti-dust vibrations to automatically shake the sensor with the SteadyShot mechanism each time the camera is shut off. There is also a manual cleaning mode, where the camera first shakes the sensor, then lifts the mirror and opens the shutter, allowing access to the sensor for use with a blower or other cleaning device.

580